Wadworth is a civil parish in the metropolitan borough of Doncaster, South Yorkshire, England.  The parish contains 14 listed buildings that are recorded in the National Heritage List for England.  Of these, two are listed at Grade I, the highest of the three grades, two are at Grade II*, the middle grade, and the others are at Grade II, the lowest grade.  The parish contains the village of Wadworth and the surrounding countryside.  The most important buildings in the parish are St John's Church and Wadworth Hall, both listed at Grade I.  The other listed buildings are structures associated with Wadworth Hall, farmhouses and farm buildings, and the entrance gateway to a school.

Key

Buildings

References

Citations

Sources

 

Lists of listed buildings in South Yorkshire
Buildings and structures in the Metropolitan Borough of Doncaster